Herbert Louis "Hub" Wagner (September 20, 1904 – August 15, 1992) was an American football and basketball coach. He served as the head football coach at Carthage College in Carthage, Illinois for seven seasons, from 1936 to 1942, compiling a record of 20–29–6.  Wagner was also the head basketball coach at Carthage from 1927 to 1943, tallying a mark of 170–107.

Head coaching record

Football

References

1904 births
1992 deaths
Basketball coaches from Iowa
Carthage Firebirds men's basketball coaches
Carthage Firebirds football coaches
Sportspeople from Davenport, Iowa